Silvana Amati (born 31 August 1947) is an Italian politician from the Democratic Party. As of 2014 she serves as member of the Senate of Italy.

References

1947 births
Living people
People from the Province of Ancona
Democratic Party (Italy) politicians
21st-century Italian women politicians
Senators of Legislature XV of Italy
Senators of Legislature XVI of Italy
Senators of Legislature XVII of Italy
Women members of the Senate of the Republic (Italy)